Khiroja Roy (born 14 August 1910, date of death unknown) was an Indian cricketer. He played three first-class matches for Bengal between 1939 and 1941.

See also
 List of Bengal cricketers

References

External links
 

1910 births
Year of death missing
Indian cricketers
Bengal cricketers
People from Mymensingh District